The Town of Manassa is the Statutory Town that is the most populous municipality in Conejos County, Colorado, United States.  The town population was 991 at the 2010 United States Census.

History
Today, approximately half of Manassa's residents are of Spanish and Mexican heritage. Migration patterns demonstrate how people from northern New Mexico settled this area in the mid 19th century. Many are the descendants of colonists from the Spanish colonial period beginning in 1598 with Juan de Oñate's colonization of New Mexico. Most of the other citizens of Manassa are the descendants of the Mormon pioneers who founded Manassa in 1879, and named the town after Manasseh, a son of the Israelite Joseph.
Manassa was located a short distance from two ranches purchased by the Mormons from Hispanos on the south side of the Conejos River, across from Los Cerritos.

The selection of the land for the colony was made on the assurance that the railroad would soon be built nearby. However, one year later the railroad bypassed the colony, and instead passed through Romeo, just  to the west.

Geography

The land within Manassa city limits is entirely flat, with rolling hills nearby. Foothills and mountains (taller than ) are farther in each direction, including the Sangre de Cristo Range to the east and the San Juan Mountains to the west.

The U.S. Post Office ZIP code for Manassa is 81141, and the area code is 719.

Manassa experiences a semi-arid climate (Köppen BSk) with cold, dry winters and warm, somewhat wetter summers.

Demographics

As of the census of 2000, there were 1,042 people, 362 households, and 280 families residing in the town. The racial makeup of the town was 81.00% White, 0.48% African American, 1.63% Native American, 0.10% Asian, 0.19% Pacific Islander, 13.24% from other races, and 3.36% from two or more races. Hispanic or Latino of any race were 48.75% of the population.

There were 362 households, out of which 41.2% had children under the age of 18 living with them, 59.1% were married couples living together, 13.5% had a female householder with no husband present, and 22.4% were non-families. 20.7% of all households were made up of individuals, and 9.1% had someone living alone who was 65 years of age or older. The average household size was 2.88 and the average family size was 3.33.

In the town, the population was spread out, with 33.7% under the age of 18, 9.4% from 18 to 24, 22.9% from 25 to 44, 20.3% from 45 to 64, and 13.6% who were 65 years of age or older. The median age was 31 years. For every 100 females, there were 95.9 males. For every 100 females age 18 and over, there were 97.4 males.

The median income for a household in the town was $23,092, and the median income for a family was $26,827. Males had a median income of $23,295 versus $16,029 for females. The per capita income for the town was $12,576. About 23.2% of families and 28.6% of the population were below the poverty line, including 40.8% of those under age 18 and 19.4% of those age 65 or over.

Streets

Manassa's wide streets, such as those typically found elsewhere in towns started by Mormons, are fashioned in a grid system. The town fits perfectly in a township and comprises close to one square mile, made up of eight blocks by eight blocks for a total of 64 city blocks. From east to west, the streets are numbered First through Ninth. From south to north, the streets are named South, Jack, Morgan, Smith, Main (aka State Highway 142), Berthelson, Peterson, Dotson, and North.

Manassa's mile-long Main Street is designated State Highway 142, connecting Romeo and U.S. Route 285  to the west, with the historic town of San Luis in Costilla County  to the east. The San Luis Hills are east of Manassa, on State Highway 142, between Manassa and San Luis.

Transportation

Travel connections to major cities are generally made at Colorado Springs, Denver, or Albuquerque. With daily flights to Denver, the nearest commercial airport is in Alamosa  to the north. Alamosa, with a population of about 8,500, is the home of Adams State University and is also the main trading center for the San Luis Valley.

Schools and churches
Manassa students attend public schools in the North Conejos RE-1J School District. The high school teams are the Falcons, and the school colors are red and white.

There are two churches in Manassa: St. Theresa of the Baby Jesus Roman Catholic Church, and a meetinghouse for the Church of Jesus Christ of Latter-day Saints.

Pioneer Days

The community-at-large, and people from all over the San Luis Valley and beyond, celebrate Manassa Pioneer Days with a parade on two days, horse races, rodeo, motorcross races, demolition derby, fireworks, entertainment, barbecues, and 5K run. A carnival at Pioneer Days brings the Tilt-a-Whirl, bumper cars, a merry-go-round and other midway rides. Bandstand entertainment and vendor booths line Manassa's city park on Main Street.

One of the oldest festivals in the state, the 132nd annual celebration was held in 2011 and is an annual event. The weekend-long affair is held on the weekend closest to July 24, in honor of the arrival of Brigham Young and fellow members of the Church of Jesus Christ of Latter-day Saints in Utah's Great Salt Lake Valley on July 24, 1847. The Mormon pioneers, as they were commonly known, left their settlement in Nauvoo, Illinois, and journeyed west seeking refuge from religious persecution.

Each year, attendance at Manassa's Pioneer Days is estimated at close to 10,000 per day, with people coming from many parts of the country to visit family and friends and to enjoy the festivities.

Notable people

 Heavyweight champion boxer Jack Dempsey (aka The Manassa Mauler). The Jack Dempsey Museum is located on the town's main street.
 John Salazar, served as Commissioner of the Colorado Department of Agriculture from 2011 to 2015 and U.S. representative from Colorado's 3rd congressional district from 2005 to 2011
 Ken Salazar, Appointed by President Joe R. Biden to serve as United States Ambassador to Mexico, former Secretary of the United States Department of the Interior, former U.S. senator, Democrat, first elected 2004 for a six-year term. Former Attorney General for the State of Colorado.

Turquoise mine

Manassa turquoise is mined east of Manassa. It is known for its blue-green to green color with a golden or brown, non-webbed matrix. The Manassa mine is still in production and owned by the King family, thus the alternate name sometimes used for this turquoise. This stone is a favorite of many; the beautiful green color is very striking, excellent when used in gold.

This site, originally mined by Ancestral Pueblo peoples, was rediscovered in 1890 by gold prospector I.P. King, and his descendants still work the claim. King's Manassa turquoise is best known for its brilliant greens and golden matrices, but blue and blue-green turquoise was found amid these deposits as well.

Media

The Valley Courier Newspaper in Alamosa and the SLV Dweller, "a website dedicated to all things San Luis Valley," are two media outlets covering events in and near Manassa.

Political representation
 Colorado State House District 32 (Ed Vigil, D-San Luis)
 Colorado State Senate District 5 (Gail Schwartz, D-Snowmass Village)
 U. S. Representative District 3 (lauren Boebert, R-Rifle)
 United States Senators: John Hickenlooper (D), and Michael Bennet (D)

See also

Outline of Colorado
Index of Colorado-related articles
State of Colorado
Colorado cities and towns
Colorado municipalities
Colorado counties
Conejos County, Colorado
San Luis Valley

References

External links
Town of Manassa contacts
CDOT map of the Town of Manassa
The Manassa Project, information about the Manassa Pioneer Day Celebration
Comprehensive Collection of video and quite a few photographs of Manassa and the surrounding area, as well as a collection of stories and articles from the San Luis Valley Dweller
Manassa at City-data.com

Towns in Conejos County, Colorado
Towns in Colorado
Populated places established in 1879
1879 establishments in Colorado